Tumelo Bodibe (born 22 November 1987) is a South African cricketer. He was included in the Griqualand West cricket team squad for the 2015 Africa T20 Cup.

References

External links
 

1987 births
Living people
South African cricketers
Griqualand West cricketers
Northern Cape cricketers
Easterns cricketers
Sportspeople from Gauteng
Wicket-keepers